The 1952–53 Spartan League season was the 35th in the history of Spartan League. The league consisted of 16 clubs.

League table

Premier Division

The division featured 16 clubs, including four that were new to the division:
 Ware
 Tufnell Park Edmonton, from Isthmian League
 Ford Sports
 Polytechnic

References

Spartan League seasons
9